Thomson Medical Centre Limited (Abbreviation: TMC) is a 190-bed private hospital located at Thomson Road in Singapore. The hospital specialises in gynaecology and in vitro fertilisation (IVF). Thomson Medical Centre runs a 24-hour outpatient family clinic, as well as a range of specialist clinics.

History
Thomson Medical Centre began operations in 1979. The founder, Dr Cheng Wei Chen, an Obstetrics & Gynaecology specialist, aimed to “make delivery an enjoyable experience for women” through his hospital.

The hospital was built on the grounds of Dr Cheng's wife's family bungalow and on a neighbouring parcel of land that used to house Yamaha Music School. Construction of the hospital took place over nine months in 1978, in collaboration with his brother and architect, William Cheng, while Dr Cheng still operated his practice from a small plot on-site.

When Thomson Medical Centre became operational in 1979, they were the only private niche hospital for women and children in Singapore, specialising in obstetrics, gynaecology and paediatrics.

The hospital expanded in the late 90s to include more clinics and other facilities.

In 2010 Thomson Medical Centre was bought by billionaire Peter Lim for around $400 million.

Customer-Centric Initiative 
The staff of Thomson Medical Centre are also known as Thomson Angels and are recognised for being “cheerful, responsive and attentive.”  In 2008, Thomson Medical Centre embarked on the Customer-Centric Initiative (CCI) which was spearheaded by SPRING Singapore. The medical centre topped the CCI rankings in the healthcare industry and achieved a 93% patient satisfaction level in 2009.

Baby Tagging Solution
In 2013, Thomson Medical Centre introduced the Baby Tagging Solution developed by Cadi Scientific, to ensure that newborns are correctly matched with their mothers. With this system, a mother and her baby are fitted with pre-matched tags upon their arrival at the maternity ward and when the baby is brought to his or her mother, the mother's tag will automatically verify if the baby is the correct one. If the tags do not match, a red light will flash on the mother's tag instead. The General Manager of Thomson Medical Centre, Mrs Mega Shuen, shared that the health and safety of their patients are their top priority.

Parentcraft Centre
Pre-birth care and parent coaching services are accessible through the Thomson Parentcraft Centre, where expectant mothers can learn to prepare for their experience during pregnancy and after delivery.

In-vitro fertilisation (IVF)
Thomson Medical Centre is the first private hospital in Singapore to set up an In-vitro fertilisation clinic on its premises. In 1988, the hospital delivered Singapore's first IVF triplets. In the same year, the Thomson Fertility Clinic was set up. As of 2009, more than 5,000 couples have been treated for fertility and over 900 IVF babies have been born at their clinic.

In 1989, Thomson Medical Centre delivered Asia's first set of surviving IVF quadruplets, delivered by Dr Cheng. The Tan quadruplets are born on Mother's Day and consist of three girls and a boy. Since 1990, fertility specialists have capped the number of implanted embryos at three, making the Tan quadruplets one of the last IVF quadruplets in Singapore.

In 1990, the hospital produced its first frozen embryo baby.

In 2000, they were the world's first fertility clinic to produce twins from frozen eggs and frozen sperm.

Business Operations

Thomson Medical Centre was listed on the SGX-SESDAQ board in 2005, becoming the fourth healthcare services provider listed on SGX, after Parkway Holdings, Raffles Medical Group and Health Management International. Thomson Medical Centre however was acquired by investor Peter Lim and subsequently delisted on 24 January 2011.

The centre offers a range of maternity and baby items.

Milestones

IVF mix-up
In 2010, an IVF mix-up produced a baby with a different father's sperm. Thomson Medical were fined the maximum S$20,000 for failing to ensure suitable assisted reproduction practices were followed, as well as being banned from new IVF for 8 months. After a long-running case, in March 2017 the mother of the child was awarded 30% of the costs of bringing up the child, with whom she does not share a 'genetic affinity'.

See also
List of hospitals in Singapore
Singapore
International healthcare accreditation
Medical tourism

References

External links
 Thomson Medical Centre Website

1979 establishments in Singapore
Companies formerly listed on the Singapore Exchange
Hospitals in Singapore
Novena, Singapore
Hospitals established in 1979